Acca or ACCA may refer to:

Mythology
 Acca, one of the comrades of Camilla in Greek mythology
 Acca Larentia, goddess in Roman mythology

Organizations
 Aerospace Industries Association, previously the Aeronautical Chamber of Commerce
 American Clinical and Climatological Association, founded in 1884
 American College Counseling Association
 American Corporate Counsel Association, now Association of Corporate Counsel (ACC), a group for attorneys of private-sector organizations
 Anglican Catholic Church in Australia
 Antiochian Catholic Church in America, one of the Independent Catholic Churches
 Association of Chartered Certified Accountants, a UK-based accountancy body which offers the Chartered Certified Accountant qualification
 Association of Christian College Athletics, an organization of collegiate athletics
 Australian Centre for Contemporary Art, an art gallery in Melbourne
 United States Army Court of Criminal Appeals, an appellate court that reviews certain court-martial convictions of U.S. Army personnel

People
 Three Anglo-Saxon bishops:
 Acca of Dunwich, 7th century Bishop of Dunwich
 Acca of Hereford (died c. 764), Bishop of Hereford
 Acca of Hexham (c. 660 – 740/742), saint and Bishop of Hexham

Science and technology
 Acca (plant), a genus of plants native to South America
 Acetyl-CoA carboxylase, in biology
 Adaptive chosen-ciphertext attack, in cryptography
 Advanced Composite Cargo Aircraft, a project of the US Air Force Research Laboratory

Other uses
 ACCA: 13-ku Kansatsu-ka, a Japanese manga series written and illustrated by Natsume Ono
 Acre, Israel (transliterated as "Acca" from an Arabic spelling)
 Acca, a silk fabric decorated with gold, named for the city
 Accumulator bet, in gambling 
 Armed Career Criminal Act, in law
 Acapulco (nightclub), a nightclub in Halifax, England known as the Acca

Masculine given names
Old English given names